Thiruthani is a 2012 Indian Tamil-language vigilante action film written and directed by Perarasu, who has also composed the film's music. The film stars Bharath and Sunaina, while Rajkiran, Pandiarajan and Ashish Vidyarthi also plays other pivotal roles. K. Bala handled cinematography, while V. Jaishankar worked the cinematography. The film released on 19 October 2012.the film received highly negative response & became utter flop at the box office.

Plot
The film opens with Velu (Bharath) beating up men who cause trouble to his sister for celebrating Diwali. Duraipandi (Rajkiran), an ex-military officer, proudly watches the fight along with many others. However, Duraipandi becomes furious when Velu refuses to save an athlete from having his leg broken, despite his pleas for help. It is here that Velu justifies his actions, saying that everyone stood watching as his unconscious mother was left locked up in a burning building for fear that they would be killed by the local rowdies. Meanwhile, Velu falls in love with Sugeesha (Sunaina), an orphan who goal in life is to marry a person with a large family.

Velu then gets involved in an accident causing severe damages to his skull. The treating doctor privately tells him that he would only live for another six months. Unable to bear the thought of his family being depressed upon his death, he becomes harsh with them, believing that this would make them hate him. Seeing this, Duraipandi advises that he should kill the local rowdies so that everyone can live peacefully and that he will not face jail as he is about to die. As time passes, Velu under the name of Thiruthani starts to kill the rowdies and he soon becomes one of the most wanted criminals. The corrupt minister Andiyappan (Ashish Vidyarthi) orders the police to encounter Thiruthani. Shocked at this news, the doctor informs Thiruthani that he lied only because of Duraipandi's request. Furious, Thiruthani advances on Duraipandi only to find out that the latter has lost one leg in the army. Thiruthani decides to surrender to the police but he is attacked by Andiyappan and his henchmen. Thiruthani kills them all, but when the police come to the spot, Duraipandi takes the blame for the murders (as no one has seen Thiruthani) and he gets shot. Later, Velu under the new name of Swami Malai continues his vigilantism against the rowdies.

Cast

Production
Immediately after the release of Pazhani in January 2008, Perarasu announced that he would make another action film starring Bharath titled Thiruthani. However the actor's commitment to Durai's Nepali and Venkatesh's Killadi meant that he was unable to start the project at the time, so Perarasu moved on to make Thiruvannamalai with Arjun. Bharath is playing a gym-trainer in this film.

The film re-emerged in January 2009 as the team geared up for a first schedule with reports emerging that Sai Kumar had replaced Prakash Raj in a pivotal role. Other sources added that musician Srikanth Deva was added to the cast, while actress Sunaina, who had featured in the successful films Kadhalil Vizhunthen and Maasilamani was added to the cast in August 2009. Perarasu subsequently announced that he would also produce the film as well as compose the film's music and recorded a song with T. Rajendar.

Filming was held across locations including Pazhani and Madurai in October 2009, while songs were canned in New Zealand that year. However the progress of the film became hampered and 2010 passed without much publicity, with Bharath spending time completing his other projects. In April 2011, it was revealed that two songs in the film were only left to be shot and team departed in May to film the songs in France.

Soundtrack
Music is composed by director Perarasu himself making his debut and also wrote the lyrics for all songs. The audio was released on 20 August at Kamala Theatres. The function saw the presence of several big wigs from the industry, including SJ Suryah, AR Murgadoss, K Bhagyaraj, Pandirajan, SAC, Jeyam Raja, Srikanth Deva, PL Thenappan and Dhananjayan amongst others and was released in their presence. Soundtrack contains six songs.

Thiruthani received mostly mixed and negative reviews. Behindwoods wrote:"Perarasu’s attempts at turning a music director have met with forgettable results. Except one passable melody song, the rest are just not up to scratch. But these songs might make the rounds in village 'thiruvizhas' thanks to the bevy of 'kuthu' numbers". Musicperk wrote:"This one is an overall disappointing show by Perarasu although he shines in parts, [sic] the album fails to gel with today’s times. It does not provide anything refreshingly different and innovatively new for the GEN-Y of today. The tunes all seem like you have heard them somewhere before.

Release
The film, who had been in the making for three months and had been struck due to call sheet problems and lack of distributors, was eventually released on 19 October 2012.

Indiaglitz wrote, "If the movie managed to reflect realism a little, it would have been an easy battle for Perarasu. Happily, the content goes right and so is the execution". The Times of India gave 3.5 out of 5 and said, "Perarasu manages to give us quite a powerful film, by making sparks fly out of electrical machinery whenever and wherever possible. In these power-strapped times, this is indeed a more fanciful sight than the foreign locations we get to see in the listless songs". Behindwoods.com rated the film 3 out 5 and stated, "Even for people who just want some kind of a usual Perarsu entertainer at the end of a hard day’s work, but the movie was far better than Ajith starrer Thirupathi. Thiruthani has managed to do justice".

References

External links
 

2012 films
2010s Tamil-language films
Indian action films
2012 masala films
Films shot in Madurai
Films shot in New Zealand
2012 action films